Elaeocarpus hylobroma is species of flowering plant in the family Elaeocarpaceae and is endemic to north-east Queensland. It is a small tree with elliptic to egg-shaped leaves with a few serrations near the tip, racemes of white flowers and dull blue, oval fruit.

Description
The leaves are glossy green on the upper surface, paler below, and have between two and six serrations on the outer edges. There are between eleven and fourteen stamens.

Taxonomy
Elaeocarpus hylobroma was first formally described in 2012 by Yumiko Baba and Darren M. Crayn in the Kew Bulletin from specimens collected in the Dinden National Park near Mareeba in 2004. The specific epithet (hylobroma) means "forest food", referring to the value of the seeds as a food source for native animals.

Distribution and habitat

Conservation status
This quandong is listed as of "least concern" under the Queensland Government Nature Conservation Act 1992.

References

hylobroma
Oxalidales of Australia
Plants described in 2012